Jason Mahendra Singh (born 12 March 1974) is an Australian singer-songwriter-guitarist. From 1997 to 2006 he fronted the rock band Taxiride as their lead singer. In March 2009 he issued a duet single, "The World As You Know It", with Todd Watson, that peaked at No. 10 on the ARIA Club Tracks chart.

Biography

Jason Mahendra Singh was born in Melbourne and has two older sisters. His father, Mahendra Singh, is an Indo-Fijian, and his mother is of Maltese descent. While in high school Singh formed a covers band, Mud, singing lead vocals. He started playing guitar in the mid-1990s. He played in the live music scene in Melbourne throughout the 1990s.

Singh joined Taxiride in 1997; in October 2013 recalled his audition, "I sang Tracy Chapman's 'Give Me One Reason'. They changed the key higher, and I could do it. They kept changing the key higher and higher, and I could still do it... The next day they said, 'You’re in the band'." Fellow founders were Daniel Hall on bass guitar, guitar and backing vocals; Tim Watson on lead guitar and backing vocals; and Tim Wild on guitar and backing vocals.

The group recorded a demo at Melbourne's Secret Sound Studios, and used it to land a contract with Warner in 1999. Taxiride went on to achieve a number-one album and six top 40 singles.

In March 2009 Singh issued a duet single, "The World As You Know It" with Todd Watson, which peaked at No. 10 on the ARIA Club Tracks. He released his debut solo album, Humannequin, in 2012. In 2015 he set himself a goal of writing, proceeding and releasing six singles in 12 months. The first single was released in October 2015 and the sixth in August 2016. He held a special performance on 2 September 2016 at Flying Saucer Club in Melbourne to celebrate the achievement. It was the first chance to hear all six songs in a live arena.

Personal life 

Jason Singh and his wife, Leah, have been together since about 1997. They are the parents of two children.

Discography

Albums

Singles

References

1974 births
Living people
Australian male singers
Singers from Melbourne
Desi musicians
Taxiride members
Australian people of Indo-Fijian descent
Australian people of Maltese descent